Ángel Abel Mavil Soto (born 30 July 1966) is a Mexican politician affiliated with the PRI. He currently serves as Deputy of the LXII Legislature of the Mexican Congress representing Veracruz since 21 August 2013.

References

1966 births
Living people
Politicians from Veracruz
Institutional Revolutionary Party politicians
21st-century Mexican politicians
Deputies of the LXII Legislature of Mexico
Members of the Chamber of Deputies (Mexico) for Veracruz